Branchton railway station is a railway station in Scotland opened in 1967 under British Rail located in the south-west of the town of Greenock, beside the area called Branchton. The station is managed by ScotRail.

Services 

Gallery

Notes

References 
 
 
 

Railway stations in Greenock
Railway stations opened by British Rail
Railway stations in Great Britain opened in 1967
SPT railway stations
Railway stations served by ScotRail